John Ballantyne Vernon (3 September 1929 – 21 June 2019) was an Australian high jumper who competed in the 1956 Summer Olympics.

References

1929 births
2019 deaths
Australian male high jumpers
Olympic athletes of Australia
Athletes (track and field) at the 1956 Summer Olympics
Commonwealth Games competitors for Australia
Athletes (track and field) at the 1950 British Empire Games
Athletes (track and field) at the 1954 British Empire and Commonwealth Games